The 2020 Six Nations Championship (known as the Guinness Six Nations for sponsorship reasons) was the 21st Six Nations  Championship, the annual rugby union competition contested by the national teams of England, France, Ireland, Italy, Scotland, and Wales, and the 126th edition of the competition (including all the tournament's previous versions as the Home Nations Championship and Five Nations Championship). The tournament began on 1 February 2020, and was scheduled to conclude on 14 March; however, due to the COVID-19 pandemic, Italy's penultimate match against Ireland and all three of the final weekend's matches were postponed with the intention of being rescheduled. It was the first time any match had been postponed since 2012, and the first time more than one match had been delayed since the outbreak of foot-and-mouth disease in 2001. In July 2020, a revised fixture schedule was announced, with the last four games being played in October.

England became the first team to win the title despite losing their first game since Wales did so in 2013. It was England's 39th title overall (including shared titles), drawing them level with the record Wales set the previous year, and extended their record of 29 outright titles.

Participants

Squads

Table

Table ranking rules

 Four points are awarded for a win.
 Two points are awarded for a draw.
 A bonus point is awarded to a team that scores four or more tries in a match or loses a match by seven points or fewer. If a team scores four tries in a match and loses by seven points or fewer, they are awarded both bonus points.
 Three bonus points are awarded to a team that wins all five of their matches (a Grand Slam). This ensures that a Grand Slam winning team will always top the table with a minimum of 23 points. A team that loses a single match could only achieve a maximum of 22 points – they could win four matches with four try bonus points and lose the remaining match but still win two bonus points while losing that game.
 Tiebreakers:
 If two or more teams are tied on table points, the team with the better match points difference (points scored less points conceded) is ranked higher.
 If the above tiebreaker fails to separate tied teams, the team that scores the higher number of total tries in its matches is ranked higher.
 If two or more teams remain tied for first place at the end of the championship after applying the above tiebreakers, the title will be shared between them.

Fixtures
The fixtures were announced on 20 March 2019. For the first time since 2013, no matches were scheduled on a Friday night. The final match of the tournament also returned to peak time for the first time since 2016.

Round 1

Notes:
Johnny McNicholl and Nick Tompkins (both Wales) and Niccolò Cannone and Danilo Fischetti (both Italy) made their international debuts.
Josh Adams became the second Welsh player to score a hat-trick in the Six Nations after George North scored three times against Italy in 2015.
Italy were held to zero points for the first time since losing 29–0 to Scotland in 2017.

Notes:
Caelan Doris and Rónan Kelleher (both Ireland), and Nick Haining (Scotland) made their international debuts.	
Simon Berghan (Scotland) was originally named as a replacement, but he was replaced on the day of the game by WP Nel.
Ireland retained the Centenary Quaich.

Notes:
Anthony Bouthier, Mohamed Haouas, Boris Palu, Arthur Vincent and Cameron Woki (all France) and George Furbank and Will Stuart (both England) made their international debuts.
Damian Penaud (France) was originally named in the starting line-up, but was ruled out with a calf injury. Vincent Rattez replaced him, while Arthur Vincent took Rattez's place on the bench.
France won their opening Six Nations match for the first time since beating Italy 23–21 in 2016. England lost their opening Six Nations match for the first time since 2014, which was also a loss to France in Paris.
England failed to score points in the first half for the first time in a Six Nations match since their 35–3 victory over Ireland in 1988.

Round 2

Notes:
Max Deegan (Ireland) made his international debut.
Owen Williams was named on the bench for Wales but was replaced by Jarrod Evans due to a calf injury.

Notes:
Ben Earl (England) made his international debut.
England reclaimed the Calcutta Cup for the first time since 2017.

Notes:
Alessandro Zanni (Italy) was originally named in the starting line-up, but suffered an injury in the pre-match warm-up and replaced by Dean Budd. Budd's place on the bench was taken by Jimmy Tuivaiti.
France retained the Giuseppe Garibaldi Trophy.

Round 3

Notes:
Will Rowlands (Wales), Dylan Cretin and Jean-Baptiste Gros (both France) made their international debuts.
This was France's first Six Nations win in Cardiff since 2010.

Notes:
Jonathan Joseph (England) earned his 50th test cap.
England retained the Millennium Trophy.
Iain Henderson was named as a lock for Ireland, but withdrew from the team for family reasons; he was replaced by Devin Toner, whose place on the bench was taken by Ultan Dillane.

Round 4

Notes:
England secured their 26th Triple Crown, their first since 2016.
Manu Tuilagi became the first England player to be sent off since Elliot Daly was dismissed against Argentina in 2016. It was also the first red card in a Six Nations match since Stuart Hogg was sent off for Scotland against Wales in 2014.
Alun Wyn Jones made a record 57th Six Nations appearance for Wales.

Notes:
Kyle Steyn (Scotland) made his international debut.
Fraser Brown (Scotland) earned his 50th test cap.
With France's defeat, no team could win the Grand Slam.
Scotland reclaimed the Auld Alliance Trophy.
This was Scotland's 200th win in the Six Nations, including Home Nations and Five Nations tournaments.
Scotland won back-to-back matches against France, after also defeating them in August 2019, for the first time since 1964.
Camille Chat was named on the bench for France as hooker, but withdrew in the warm-up ahead of the game due to a hamstring injury, with Peato Mauvaka replacing him.

Note:
Ed Byrne, Will Connors, Jamison Gibson-Park, Hugo Keenan (all Ireland), Gianmarco Lucchesi, Paolo Garbisi and Federico Mori (all Italy) made their international debuts.
This result meant Italy won the Wooden Spoon for the fifth consecutive year, and their 15th since joining the Six Nations.

Round 5

Notes:
 Wales made 19 changes to the team that was selected for the original fixture on 14 March, while Scotland made 15 changes.
 Justin Tipuric was named in the starting XV at openside flanker, but was ruled out ahead of kick-off. James Davies replaced him in the starting team with Aaron Wainwright joining the replacements.
 Alun Wyn Jones (Wales) earned his 149th international cap (140 for Wales, 9 for the British and Irish Lions) to surpass New Zealand's Richie McCaw's record as the most capped international rugby player.
 Shane Lewis-Hughes (Wales) and Scott Steele (Scotland) made their international debuts.
 Scotland won three consecutive Six Nations matches for the first time since 1996.
 This was Scotland's first win in Wales since 2002.
 Wales finished in fifth place with one win, their worst performance since 2007.
 Wales played a home game away from the Millennium Stadium for the first time since playing Romania at the Racecourse Ground in Wrexham in 2003. It was also the first Welsh international played in Llanelli since 1998 and the first Six Nations game in Llanelli since 1893, making this the first international match played at Parc y Scarlets.
 Scotland won the Doddie Weir Cup for the first time.

Notes:
 Ben Youngs became the second England player after Jason Leonard to earn his 100th test cap.
 Jamie George (England) earned his 50th test cap.
 Tom Dunn, Jonny Hill, Ollie Lawrence and Ollie Thorley (all England) made their international debuts.
 Italy were whitewashed for the fifth consecutive year.

Notes:
 Arthur Retière (France) made his international debut.
 Cian Healy became the sixth Ireland player to earn his 100th test cap.
 France required a win by 28 points to win the championship, while Ireland needed a bonus-point win or a margin of seven points (or six if they scored at least one try). As neither side met their requirements, England won a record 29th outright title.

Player statistics

Most points

Most tries

See also
 2020 end-of-year rugby union internationals
 Autumn Nations Cup

Notes

References

 
2020
2020 rugby union tournaments for national teams
2019–20 in European rugby union
2019–20 in Irish rugby union
2019–20 in English rugby union
2019–20 in Welsh rugby union
2019–20 in Scottish rugby union
2019–20 in French rugby union
2019–20 in Italian rugby union
February 2020 sports events in Europe
February 2020 sports events in the United Kingdom
March 2020 sports events in Europe
March 2020 sports events in the United Kingdom
October 2020 sports events in France
October 2020 sports events in Italy
October 2020 sports events in the United Kingdom
Rugby union events postponed due to the COVID-19 pandemic